FitzRobert is an English surname of Norman origin. Notable people with this surname include:

John FitzRobert, Lord of Warkworth Castle.
Mabel FitzRobert, Anglo-Norman noblewoman.
William Fitz Robert, son of Sir Robert de Caen.
William Fitz-Robert, Earl of Cornwall
Robert FitzRobert, 1st Earl of Gloucester.
Maud FitzRobert, Anglo-Norman noblewoman.
Simon of Wells, also known as Simon FitzRobert, medieval Bishop.
William the Conqueror, the illegitimate child of Robert the Magnificent.
William de Chesney, also known as William FitzRobert, Anglo-Norman nobleman and sheriff.

Patronymic surnames
Surnames from given names